Vardal is a former municipality in the old Oppland county, Norway. The  municipality existed from 1838 until its dissolution in 1964. The area is now divided between Gjøvik Municipality and Vestre Toten Municipality in the traditional district of Vestoppland. The administrative centre was the village of Vardal.

History
The prestegjeld of Vardal was established as a municipality on 1 January 1838 (see formannskapsdistrikt law). According to the 1835 census the parish had a population of 2,921 shortly before it became a municipality. On 1 January 1861 the town of Gjøvik (population: 626) was separated from Vardal to constitute a separate municipality, leaving Vardal with a population of 4,114. On 1 January 1896, a small area of Østre Toten Municipality (population: 49) was transferred into Vardal. On 1 January 1900, an unpopulated area of Søndre Land Municipality was transferred to Vardal.

During the 20th century, the town of Gjøvik was growing and twice the town annexed parts of Vardal. On 1 July 1921, an area with 723 residents was taken from Vardal and added to Gjøvik. Then again on 1 July 1955, another area (population: 1,372) was transferred from Vardal to Gjøvik. During the 1960s, there were many municipal mergers across Norway due to the work of the Schei Committee. On 1 January 1964, Vardal Municipality was dissolved and its lands and people were transferred to neighboring municipalities:
the Sørligrenda area (population: 87) was merged with Vestre Toten Municipality (population: 9,113), Eina Municipality (population: 1,591), and a small part of Gran Municipality (population: 12) to form a new Vestre Toten Municipality.
the rest of Vardal (population: 9,612) was merged with the town of Gjøvik (population: 8,251), Snertingdal Municipality (population: 2,471), and Biri Municipality (population: 3,274) to form a new Gjøvik Municipality.

Name
The municipality was named Vardal after the valley in which it is located. The Old Norse form of the name was Vardalr. The first element is probably an old river name which could possibly come from the word  which means "quiet" or "calm". The last element is dalr which means "dale" or "valley".

Government
All municipalities in Norway, including Vardal, are responsible for primary education (through 10th grade), outpatient health services, senior citizen services, unemployment and other social services, zoning, economic development, and municipal roads. The municipality was governed by a municipal council of elected representatives, which in turn elected a mayor.

Municipal council
The municipal council  of Vardal was made up of 29 representatives that were elected to four year terms.  The party breakdown of the final municipal council was as follows:

Mayor
The mayors of Vardal:

1837-1839: Hans Skikkelstad
1840-1845: Hans Peter Borchgrevink 
1845-1847: Henrik Christian Borchgrevink 
1848-1849: Christian Braastad 
1850-1865: Johan Braastad 	
1866-1869: Peder Mustad 
1870-1881: Anders Jørgensen Veum 	
1882-1889: Nicolai Forseth 	
1890-1891: Peter Braastad 	
1892-1895: Andreas Kastad 	
1896-1898: Lars J. Aalstad
1899-1901: Andreas Kastad 
1902-1910: Halvor Fosmark (AD)
1910-1922: Arne Fosnes (AD)
1922-1925: Kristian Nyjordet (Bp)
1926-1928: Ludvig Skjerven (RF)
1929-1937: Knut A. Jenseth (Ap)
1938-1940: Johannes Odnessveen (Ap)
1941-1943: Knut A. Jenseth (NS)
1943-1945: Kristian Fjeld (NS)
1945-1945: Johannes Odnessveen (Ap)
1946-1959: Andreas Nordland (Ap)
1959-1959: Harald Børresen (Ap)
1960-1963: Alf R. Iversen (Ap)

See also
List of former municipalities of Norway

References

Gjøvik
Vestre Toten
Former municipalities of Norway
1838 establishments in Norway
1964 disestablishments in Norway